"Hang 'Em High" is a musical theme composed by Dominic Frontiere for the soundtrack of the 1968 film of the same name. Though it was first covered by Hugo Montenegro, whose orchestra recorded a full album of music from the film, the tune became a hit in an R&B instrumental version by Booker T. & the M.G.'s that charted #9 Pop and #35 R&B.

References

Booker T. & the M.G.'s songs
Hugo Montenegro songs
1968 singles
Film theme songs
Stax Records singles
1968 songs
1960s instrumentals